Isoctenus is a genus of South American wandering spiders first described by Philipp Bertkau in 1880.

Species
 it contains fifteen species found in Brazil and Argentina:
Isoctenus areia Polotow & Brescovit, 2009 – Brazil
Isoctenus charada Polotow & Brescovit, 2009 – Brazil
Isoctenus corymbus Polotow, Brescovit & Pellegatti-Franco, 2005 – Brazil
Isoctenus coxalis (F. O. Pickard-Cambridge, 1902) – Brazil
Isoctenus eupalaestrus Mello-Leitão, 1936 – Brazil
Isoctenus foliifer Bertkau, 1880 (type) – Brazil
Isoctenus griseolus (Mello-Leitão, 1936) – Brazil
Isoctenus herteli (Mello-Leitão, 1947) – Brazil
Isoctenus janeirus (Walckenaer, 1837) – Brazil
Isoctenus malabaris Polotow, Brescovit & Ott, 2007 – Brazil
Isoctenus minusculus (Keyserling, 1891) – Brazil
Isoctenus ordinario Polotow & Brescovit, 2009 – Brazil, Argentina
Isoctenus segredo Polotow & Brescovit, 2009 – Brazil
Isoctenus strandi Mello-Leitão, 1936 – Brazil
Isoctenus taperae (Mello-Leitão, 1936) – Brazil

References

Araneomorphae genera
Ctenidae
Spiders of Argentina
Spiders of Brazil
Taxa named by Philipp Bertkau